Delilah Michael Lobo (born 1978) is an Indian politician and businessperson from Goa. She is the current member of the Goa Legislative Assembly, representing the Siolim Assembly constituency. Lobo won the Siolim constituency on the Indian National Congress ticket in the 2022 Goa Legislative Assembly election. She defeated four-time MLA Dayanand Mandrekar of the Bharatiya Janata Party by a margin of 1727 votes.

Early and personal life
Delilah Michael Lobo was born to Melchiades Vincent Lobo and Almira Lobo. She is married to politician and businessperson, Michael Lobo. She completed her Higher Secondary School Certificate and graduation in Bachelor of Commerce from Dnyanprassarak Mandal's College in 1998.

Political career
Lobo was a panch for a period of five years prior to contesting the Goa Legislative Assembly elections. She is also a former ten-year term Sarpanch and former BJP Mahila Morcha state vice president who quit on 11 January 2022 to join Indian National Congress party along with her husband, Michael Lobo.

On 14 September 2022, Lobo along with her husband and six other legislators of the Indian National Congress party quit to join the Bharatiya Janata Party.

Controversy
On 5 May 2022, Mapusa police registered an FIR against Lobo and her husband for illegal land filling at Parra, Goa. The FIR was filed by complainant, North Goa planning and development authority (NGPDA), at the behest of TCP minister, Vishwajit Rane.

References

1970s births
Living people
Former members of Indian National Congress from Goa
21st-century Indian women politicians
Goa MLAs 2022–2027
Year of birth uncertain
Bharatiya Janata Party politicians from Goa
Businesspeople from Goa